The 2006 Losail Superbike World Championship round was the first round of the 2006 Superbike World Championship. It took place on the weekend of February 23–25, 2006 at the Losail International Circuit in Qatar.

Results

Superbike race 1 classification

Superbike race 2 classification

Supersport race classification

References
 Superbike Race 1
 Superbike Race 2
 Supersport Race

Superbike World Championship
Losail